Vladimir Andreyevich Litvintsev (born 18 February 2001) is a Russian-Azerbaijani figure skater who represents Azerbaijan in men's singles. He is the 2018 Volvo Open Cup champion, the 2019 Open Ice Mall Cup champion, and the 2018 Ice Star silver medalist. Litvintsev represented Azerbaijan at the 2022 Winter Olympics and finished 18th overall.

Personal life 
Litvintsev was born on 18 February 2001 in Ukhta in the Komi Republic in Russia. His family moved to Moscow when he was nine.  

In 2020, Litvintsev began his studies at the Moscow State Academy of Physical Culture.

His biggest inspirations from the world of figure skating are Guillaume Cizeron, Patrick Chan, and Nathan Chen. Besides skating, Litvintsev is passionate about music; he is a beatmaker and also learning to play the piano.

Career

Early years 
Litvintsev began learning to skate in 2004 as a three-year-old. At that time, he was training together with his older brother Andrey and Dmitri Aliev at a local lake. 

After moving to Moscow, Litvintsev trained at the CSKA Moscow sports club until January 2011 and then moved to Sambo 70, where he was coached by Alexei Chetverukhin, Vladimir Kotin, and Anastasia Kazakova. 

He made no international appearances for Russia.

2018–2019 season 
In October, making his international debut for Azerbaijan, Litvintsev finished 8th at the ISU Junior Grand Prix (JGP) in Ljubljana, Slovenia. Later that month, he made his first appearance in the senior ranks, winning the silver medal at the 2018 Minsk-Arena Ice Star, behind Latvia's Deniss Vasiļjevs and ahead of Armenia's Slavik Hayrapetyan. In November, he took gold at the 2018 Volvo Open Cup – his first senior title – by a margin of about nine points over silver medalist Mark Gorodnitsky. At his first Challenger series event, the 2018 CS Tallinn Trophy, he finished ninth overall after scoring personal bests in both the free program and overall.

In January 2019, Litvintsev was named to Azerbaijan's team for the 2019 European Championships in Minsk, Belarus. He placed fourteenth in the short program and advanced to the final segment. Appearing at his first World Championships, he placed seventeenth.

2019–2020 season 
Litvintsev suffered a leg injury over the summer that forced him to withdraw from both of his Challenger series assignments, the 2019 CS Ondrej Nepela Memorial and 2019 CS Ice Star.  Making his Grand Prix debut at the 2019 Rostelecom Cup, he placed eleventh.

After a poor sixteenth-place showing at the 2019 CS Golden Spin of Zagreb and a victory at the Toruń Cup, Litvintsev concluded his season at the European Championships, where he placed ninth.  He had been assigned to compete at the World Championships in Montreal, but those were cancelled as a result of the coronavirus pandemic.

2020–2021 season 
Litvintsev has been suffering from pain in both knees. This problem was exacerbated after he had spent around three months off the ice during the COVID-19 pandemic.

With the COVID-19 pandemic continuing to affect international travel, the ISU opted to run the Grand Prix based primarily on geographic location. Litvintsev was assigned to the 2020 Rostelecom Cup, where he placed tenth.

In January 2021, Litvintsev moved to Angels of Plushenko Figure Skating Academy to train with Sergei Rozanov. He placed twenty-seventh in the short program at 2021 World Championships and did not advance to the free skate competition.

2021–2022 season 
Litvintsev and his coach Sergei Rozanov left Angels of Plushenko for Dynamo in the summer of 2021 and also spent seven weeks training in Italy and France. A foot stress fracture limited the intensity of Litvintsev's training. Later, during the season, Litvintsev returned to his former coaches at Koniok Tchaikovskoi club. 

Litvintsev began the season at the 2021 CS Lombardia Trophy, where he placed first in the short program, but dropped to fourth overall after coming fifth in the free skate. At 2021 CS Nebelhorn Trophy, he was sixth after the short program and overall, although he scored fifth in the free skate. This result qualified a place for Azerbaijan at the 2022 Winter Olympics.

At the 2022 European Championships in Tallinn, Litvintsev finished in the eighth place.

Litvintsev was a flag bearer for Azerbaijan's national team at the 2022 Winter Olympics. He achieved a new personal best of 84.15 in the short program of the men's event, finishing eighteenth in that segment and qualifying to the free skate. Nineteenth in the free skate, he remained eighteenth overall.

At the 2022 World Championships, Litvintsev achieved a new personal best in the short program and finished in sixteenth place overall.

Programs

Competitive highlights 
GP: Grand Prix; CS: Challenger Series; JGP: Junior Grand Prix

For Azerbaijan

Detailed results

Senior

Junior

References

External links 
 
Official Instagram https://www.instagram.com/vladimirlitvintsev/
 Information site: www.vladimirlitvintsev.com

2001 births
Living people
Figure skaters from Moscow
Azerbaijani male single skaters
Russian male single skaters
Russian emigrants to Azerbaijan
Figure skaters at the 2022 Winter Olympics
Olympic figure skaters of Azerbaijan